Dulje is a settlement in the Suva Reka municipality in the disputed region of Kosovo. The village is exclusively ethnic Albanian; in the 1991 census, it had 1399 inhabitants.

Geography

The village lies in Prizrenski Podgor, about 25 km east of Prizren, on the west side of the Crnoljeva and offset of the Šar Mountains. It lies in the region of Podrimlje. From its heights, one can view almost the whole of Metohija. Dulje extends over a lake terrace, nearly 1 km wide, around 750 m high, which in this part represents the border of the Metohija-Prizren region. The rural settlement lies on a cadastral area of 1413 hectares. Dulje includes two major physiognomic parts: Dulje, the main part with three mahala (hamlets); Rafš, Srpska (Mahallae Shkijeve) and Sopska; the second part is Dragačin, an isolated hamlet on the right valley side of the Dragačin river. The Suva Reka-Dulje-Mališevo road goes through the village.

Dulje was formerly a seat of a municipality with the same name, though it still represents an administrative and cultural center for the neighbouring villages.

History
The village is mentioned for the first time in the Saint Archangels charter (Svetoarhanđelska povelja) of Emperor Stephen Uroš IV Dušan, dating to 1348, as Duhlje. A medieval road crossed Dulje, from Prizren to Štimlje, further to the interior of Serbia. There are ruins of the medieval Serbian Orthodox Churches of Parascheva (Sv. Petka), on a graveyard, and the Holy Salvation (Sv. Spasa), by the spring of the Lukara stream, in the village.

In 1881, when Dervish-Pasha crushed the rebel Albanians in Ferizovići (Uroševac), he hung Albanian Sejf-Košar to a pear tree between Ferizovići and Štimlje. Some of the Albanians sought rest in Dulje Hana, after their defeat. When the innkeeper burnt trees in the furnace, the Albanians woke up in fear; they thought Dervish-Pasha had come after them shooting guns, after which they fled.

During the Serbian Campaign (World War I), in 1915, after the Bulgarian breakthrough of Serbian positions, the last Serbian contingents in Kosovo had divisions in Crnoljeva; the Cavalry Division had retreated to the Dulje Hana.

During the Kosovo War, the Kosovo Liberation Army (KLA) operated in the region and the area experienced bombings by NATO forces. KLA forces were reported to have killed and wounded several Serbian policemen and civilians.

Demographic history
The village was historically inhabited by Serbs, and the Albanian families came from Malesia in northern Albania, most likely in the 18th century. According to data which is older than the 18th century from the Devič monastery, all villages of Drenica were inhabited by Serbs. In 1875, there were 26 Albanian/Albanianized and 4 Serb families in the village. In 1879, there were 16 Albanian and 4 Serb families in the village. In 1910, there were 6 Serb families (no data on Albanians). In 1921, there were 52 houses and 299 inhabitants.

Population counts in censuses conducted between 1948 and 1991 are provided in the table below. Information on population by ethnic group is not available for most years in this period. In 1981, 1229 people were listed as Albanian and 1 person was listed as Muslim; no residents were identified as Serbs, Montenegrins, Turks, or other groups.

Annotations

Notes

References

 Onomatološki prilozi, Volume 13, Srpska akademija nauka i umetnosti. Odbor za onomastiku. Akademija, 1997. p. 540: "Дуље"
 Branislav Đ Nušić, Sabrana dela, Volume 23, NIP "Jež,", 1966 (Original: 1931)
 Branislav Đ Nušić, S Kosova na sinje more: beleške s puta kroz Arbanase 1894. godine, Čigoja štampa, 2005 (Original: "Kosovo, Opis zemlje i naroda", 1902)
 Srboljub Đ Stamenković, Географска енциклопедија населjа Србије: С-Ш, Volume 4, Географски факултет, 2002, pp. 115–118: "Дуље"
 Dimitrije M. Kalezić, Enciklopedija pravoslavlja, I, Savremena administracija, 2002, p. X: "Дуље"
 Milovan Radovanović 2008, Kosovo i Metohija: antropogeografske, istorijskogeografske, demografske i geopolitičke osnove, Službeni Glasnik
 Glasnik, Volume 4, 1952, Srpska akademija nauka i umetnosti, pp. 392–394: "Дуље"
 Petar Bojovīć, Odbrana Kosovoga polja 1915. g. i zaštita odstupanja srpske vojske preko Albanije i Crne gore, Izdavačka knjižarnica G. Kona, 1922
 Južnoslovenski Filolog, Volume 23, Srpska akademija nauka. Institut za srpski jezik, 1958
 Тодор П. Станковић, Путне белешке по Старој Србији 1871—1898
 Gavro A. Škrivanić, Путеви у средњовековној Србији, Туристичка штампа, 1974

Villages in Suva Reka